The Ambassador of the United Kingdom to Spain is the United Kingdom's foremost diplomatic representative in the Kingdom of Spain, and in charge of the UK's diplomatic mission in Spain.  The official title is His Britannic Majesty's Ambassador to the Kingdom of Spain.

The British ambassador to Spain is also non-resident ambassador to the Principality of Andorra.

In 1822, Foreign Secretary George Canning downgraded the Embassy to a Mission, and the Head of Mission from an Ambassador to an Envoy Extraordinary and Minister Plenipotentiary, to reflect Spain's decreased importance on the world stage.  The Mission in Madrid was upgraded to a full Embassy once more on 9 December 1887.

List of heads of mission

The following is a partial list of British ambassadors to Spain.

Titles of the heads of mission: 
 From 1509 to 1683: Ambassador
 From 1683 to 1710: Envoy Extraordinary
 From 1711 to 1821: Ambassador
 From 1822 to 1887: Envoy Extraordinary and Minister Plenipotentiary
 Since 1887: Ambassador

References

External links
UK and Spain, gov.uk

 
Spain
 
United Kingdom